The Fiat A.30 R.A. was an Italian water-cooled aircraft engine from the 1920s, built in large numbers and serving with several air forces up to the beginning of World War II. It produced 447 kW (600 hp).

Design and development
During the second half of the 1920s Fiat introduced several water-cooled aircraft engines, including the A.20, A.23, A.24, A.25 and A.30.  They were all upright V-12s with 60° between the cylinder banks; capacities ranged between 18.7 L and 54.5 L (1,141-3,326 cu in) and power outputs between 320 kW and 745 kW (430-1,000 hp). Producing 447 kW (600 hp) from 24.0 L (1,464 cu in), the A.30RA was towards the low power end of these ranges. The R, (Riduttori - reduced), indicated that the output was geared down.

Many of the production A.30 R.A.s were fitted in Fiat's own fighters and fighter trainers, particularly in the Fiat C.R.32. Both this aircraft type and the Meridionali Ro.37 remained in service with the Regia Aeronautica when Italy joined in World War II in 1940; by then the engine was seriously dated.  Before the war similarly powered CR.30s had been sold to the air forces of Austria, China and Paraguay, the Austrian aircraft ending their service with the Luftwaffe after the Anschluss. Ultimately 2,679 A.30 R.A. and A.30 R.A.bis engines were built.

Variants
From Thompson
A.30 R.A.
A.30 R.A.bis

Applications
From Thompson
CMASA MF.10
Fiat CR.30
Fiat CR.32
Fiat CANSA FC.12
IMAM Ro.37

Specifications (A.30 R.A.)

See also

References

1920s aircraft piston engines
A30